Parcel locker is an automated postal box that allows users for a self-service collection of parcels and oversize letters as well as the dispatch of parcels.

Amazon Locker

Amazon Locker is a self-service package delivery service of parcel lockers offered by online retailer Amazon. Amazon customers can select any Locker location as their delivery address and retrieve their orders at that location by entering a unique pick-up code on the Locker touch screen. However, certain third-party sellers on Amazon may not be able to ship to an Amazon Locker, due to their use of other shipping services such as FedEx or UPS that require a signature. There are several sizes, but when ordering, amazon.com reports some parcels are too big to be delivered to a locker.

The Amazon Locker program was launched in September 2011 in New York City, Seattle, and London. As of June 2018, Lockers were available in over 2,800 locations in 70+ cities.

Operation

A customer orders a parcel from Amazon and has it delivered to a Locker location. Amazon's preferred carriers deliver to the locker, and the customer receives a digital pick-up code via email or text messaging. Once the unique pick-up code is entered into the locker's touch screen, the assigned door opens for package retrieval. Amazon customers have three days to collect their packages once they receive their pick-up code.

Amazon customers can also return packages to select Amazon Lockers.
Amazon Lockers can sometimes be full and therefore not available when a delivery is attempted.  In that case customers will have to wait an unspecified amount of time until space is available.

Locker locations
Amazon partners with retail stores such as 7-Eleven and Spar to host Amazon Locker kiosks. Retailers receive a stipend from Amazon to host the kiosks. Staples and RadioShack joined the program briefly in 2012, only to withdraw the following year.

7-Eleven has kiosks in 186 locations in the US as of 2015.

In the United Kingdom, Amazon has a partnership with Co-op Food and Morrisons. Lockers are located within some Co-op and Morrisons stores. Since 2012, libraries in West Sussex have also been operating Lockers. Large retail centres often have Amazon Lockers, for example there are two in One New Change in London, and there is one in Stratford Centre. The largest Amazon Locker in the world and the busiest in the UK is called Ivory. It has 115 lockers and is located near the Rootes building at the University of Warwick.

Amazon has also expanded the Locker program in Canada, France, Spain, Germany and Italy.

In 2017, Amazon announced plans to launch Amazon Locker in select Whole Foods Market locations.

Amazon Hub
Amazon Hub is a delivery locker for apartment lobbies. The delivery locker accepts packages from all carriers. Amazon Hub was in beta from 2017 until June 2018, when Amazon announced that its Hub program would be available to all property management companies throughout the United States.

As of 2020, Amazon was using "Amazon Hub Locker+" to refer to a staffed version of Amazon Lockers, which allowed for customers to pick up large packages, and for customers to return items without a box.

Packstation

Packstation is a service of parcel lockers run by DHL Parcel Germany, a business unit of Deutsche Post's Mail division, in Germany and elsewhere (e.g. in Italy). It provides automated booths for a self-service collection of parcels and oversize letters as well as self-service dispatch of parcels 24 hours a day, seven days a week. Packstation started as a pilot project in 2001 and was quickly expanded. There are 3,000 Packstation machines in Germany and 90 percent of the people living in Germany were within ten minutes of a DHL Packstation. Only ordinary parcels and letters delivered by Deutsche Post can be delivered to Packstations. Moreover, Deutsche Post allows its subsidiary DHL Express Germany to insert a limited number of express parcels. Packstations were originally manufactured by the Austrian company KEBA with newer stations developed by DHL Paket in conjunction with Polygon.

A major market for Packstation is the increasing number of single people, especially students and time-poor professionals, who purchase products online but are not normally at home at daytime to accept deliveries, or who do not have the time to deposit parcels at the post office during normal opening hours.

As of November 2017 there were over 8 million registered Packstation customers in Germany according to Deutsche Post.

Operation 
Using Packstations is free of charge both for private and business customers, however prior registration through the web portal Paket.de  is required for collection of parcels.

Each customer obtains a magnetic stripe card ("Goldcard") and PIN that can be used to identify the customer at Packstation machines and post offices. Previously, it was possible to use the Packstation by entering the customer number and the PIN. This was changed in 2011 in order to increase security as said by DHL, usage of the Goldcard is mandatory now. On 29 October 2012, a mandatory mTAN was introduced, this is transmitted solely in the SMS notification or can be retrieved from the DHL Paket App. Each mTAN is valid only for one opening procedure (which may entitle to open several booths if the recipient has received numerous shipments), thereby replacing the PIN.

Pharmaceutical lockers 

Several manufacturers offer parcel lockers designed for pickup of drugs, either at pharmacies or in remote locations. One design as an integrated audio-visual connection for conferring with a pharmacist. Drug pickup lockers are deployed at some Costco pharmacies and have been piloted at CVS Health. A shortage of pharmacists in the 2020s increased pressure to adopt this solution. Though delivery of prescription drugs by mail is common, some jurisdictions (for example the U.S. state of Georgia) have laws which do not allow the use of unattended lockers.

Systems around the world

Europe 

Packstation is a service run by DHL Parcel Germany, a business unit of Deutsche Post's Mail division, in Germany and elsewhere (e.g. in Italy). It started as a pilot project in 2001 and was quickly expanded. There are 3,000 Packstation machines in Germany and 90 percent of the people living in Germany were within ten minutes of a DHL Packstation. Only ordinary parcels and letters delivered by Deutsche Post can be delivered to Packstations. Moreover, Deutsche Post allows its subsidiary DHL Express Germany to insert a limited number of express parcels. Packstations were originally manufactured by the Austrian company KEBA with newer stations developed by DHL Paket in conjunction with Polygon.

Austria's Österreichische Post introduced a virtually identical service called Post.24-Station in November 2006. The booths are manufactured by the same company that makes the packstations, KEBA. In Vienna, Stations have been erected in supermarkets, petrol stations, and post offices that can easily be reached by public transport.

In the Republic of Ireland, ParcelMotel is owned by the Nightline courier company. ParcelMotel has operated since 2012 and has 124 locations providing over 10,000 locker spaces throughout the Republic of Ireland. ParcelMotel also offers a UK address for parcel delivery which allows customers in Ireland to take advantage of free UK delivery. They also offer free/business paid return services, motel-to-motel delivery at special rates and a parcel sending service.

A company called SmartPOST, run by the Finnish Posti Group runs a network of self-service parcel terminals in Finland, Estonia, Latvia and Lithuania. The terminals are located in shopping centres and other public premises. They enable clients to send and receive parcels and pay for them at the collection point. There is a terminal for every Estonian in a range of a 15-minute drive. The parcel terminals were introduced to Finland in 2011. The parcel terminals and the software running the system are manufactured in Estonia by Cleveron.

Also, Latvian company, PostService, runs a network of 39 self-service parcel terminals in Latvia, called Mana pasta stacija (English: My Post Station). Terminals are located in 27 cities and towns in Latvia. The terminals are constructed and manufactured in Latvia by PostService itself.

Additionally as of 2022, in Baltics parcel locker services by Venipak, Omniva, DPD and Latvijas Pasts are operating.

Polish company InPost runs a network of almost 20,000 self-service parcel terminals in Poland called Paczkomaty 24/7. Terminals are located in shopping centres, car parks and gas stations. The terminals enable clients to send and receive parcels. In the United Kingdom, they operate lockers branded as 'InPost', which are found in various locations including on fuel station forecourts and at supermarkets. According to the company, they are "strategically located in urban areas where people work, shop and play".

In Russia Parcel lockers have gained a lot of popularity, with multiple big companies offering such a service. Among them are: Logibox, PickPoint, QIWI Post, EMS Russian Post, Yandex Market and Russian Post.

In France, Parcel Lockers are a fast growing segment with main players in the market being: InPost, Amazon and Vinted. 

Vinted Go (logistics service of Vinted) was launched in France in July 2022 and will place more than 13,000 Parcel Lockers across the country, creating the largest network in France and one of the largest in the world. The Lockers are manufactured by the Portuguese company Bloq.it, and are placed across nation-wide retail chains such as Franprix, Carrefour, and CASINO stores.

Americas 

Canadian company BufferBox, which was acquired by Google in November 2012, operates a similar system in Ontario. However, the service has since been suspended, and a message on their homepage shows the company is focusing on Google Express Checkout. When the pandemic arrived in early 2020, retailers scrambled to find ways to meet consumer demand for their products while simultaneously managing last-mile delivery costs, overall margins, and maintaining contactless solutions. Parcel lockers began to fill this need with companies such as ParcelPort Solutions, based in Toronto, ON, by using technology to reduce logistics costs and provide a frictionless, and contactless option for customers.

Amazon Lockers are a similar service specific to deliveries fulfilled through online retailer Amazon.

The United States Postal Service announced a similar service called "", announced in 2011 and with permanent locker installation starting in August 2014 at 17 locations in New York City and Washington, D.C.

Correos de Costa Rica offers a similar service with automated delivery machines located in various supermarkets.
The test program started in July 2017. The machines are manufactured in Costa Rica.  In 2018, the operation of the smart locker system known as API was started. The Api lockers are manufactured by Correos de Costa Rica itself. The network has 102 locations throughout Costa Ríca. With further expansion in the near future.

Asia 
A courier company called Parzel Express introduced automated delivery machines in United Arab Emirates in 2011 manufactured by KEBA.

Australia and Oceania 
Australia Post offers a similar service with facilities located in or near various post offices.

Gallery

References

External links

 Amazon locker

Express mail
Postal services
Postal infrastructure
Commercial machines